Santana do Mundaú is a municipality located in the Brazilian state of Alagoas. Its population peaked at 11,235 in 2005 and was 10,687 in 2020.

References

Municipalities in Alagoas